Leander Antwione Williams (born May 26, 1993) is a former American football linebacker. He played college football at Georgia Southern. He was drafted by the Detroit Lions in the fifth round (169th overall) in the 2016 NFL Draft.

High school career
Williams attended Lovejoy High School where he was a two-tme All-Regional selection. He was named All-county and All-South Crescent in 2009 and 2010. For his career, he recorded 63 tackles (14 solo), eight tackles-for-loss, three sacks, four interceptions, eight passes defensed, two blocked kicks and one touchdown.

College career
Williams then attended Georgia Southern University where he majored in psychology.

As a freshman in 2011, he appeared in 11 games, starting three at linebacker. He finished the season with 25 tackles and one tackle-for-loss. In 2012 as a sophomore, he appeared in 14 games, starting six. He recorded 32 tackles (17 solo) and three passes defensed. He then missed the 2013 with an injury and was given a medical redshirt. In 2014, he returned as a redshirt junior and started all 12 games. He finished second on the team with 65 tackles (44 solo), eight tackles-for-loss, three sacks, one forced fumble and four passes defensed. For the season he was named an All-Sun Belt honorable mention. He also was named to the Dean's list in the spring and was a member of the Eagle Honor Roll for the spring as well. As a redshirt senior in 2015, he started all 13 games. He recorded 107 tackles (48 solo), 10.5 tackles-for-loss, four sacks, four forced fumbles, two quarterback hurries and three passes defensed. After the season, he was named an All-Sun Belt honorable mention selection.

Career statistics

Professional career

Detroit Lions
Williams was drafted by the Detroit Lions in the fifth round (169th overall) of the 2016 NFL Draft. On May 6, he signed his four-year rookie contract. He played 14 games for the Lions in 2016, recording 12 tackles on the season.  On September 2, 2017, Williams was waived by the Lions.

Minnesota Vikings
On September 13, 2017, Williams was signed to the Minnesota Vikings' practice squad. He signed a reserve/future contract with the Vikings on January 22, 2018.

On August 31, 2018, Williams was waived by the Vikings.

Seattle Seahawks
On September 3, 2018, Williams was signed to the Seattle Seahawks' practice squad, but was released two days later.

Carolina Panthers
On December 19, 2018, Williams was signed to the Carolina Panthers practice squad.

Williams signed a reserve/future contract with the Panthers on December 31, 2018. He was waived during final roster cuts on August 30, 2019.

DC Defenders
Williams was signed by the DC Defenders of the XFL during mini-camp in December 2019. He was waived on February 29, 2020.

References

External links
 Official website
 Georgia Southern bio
 Detroit Lions bio

1993 births
Living people
People from Clayton County, Georgia
Sportspeople from the Atlanta metropolitan area
Players of American football from Birmingham, Alabama
Players of American football from Georgia (U.S. state)
American football linebackers
Georgia Southern Eagles football players
Detroit Lions players
Minnesota Vikings players
Seattle Seahawks players
Carolina Panthers players
DC Defenders players